Suresh Kumar Sharma is a political leaders

References

External links 
 

1944 births
Indian cricketers
Living people
Northern Punjab cricketers